Junto may refer to:

 Whig Junto (c. 1700), English political leaders' group, that began to dominate the ministry from 1693 and held onto power intermittently until 1717 when members of the group fell out
 Junto (club) (c. 1730), a Philadelphia club started by Benjamin Franklin
 Junto (album), the seventh album by Basement Jaxx

People with the given name
, Japanese footballer 
, Japanese professional boxer
, Japanese footballer

See also 
 Junta (disambiguation)
 Juntos (disambiguation)

Japanese masculine given names